Dmitri Leonidovich Razmazin (born 14 October 1976) is a former Russian football player.

References

1976 births
Living people
Russian footballers
FC Tyumen players
Russian Premier League players
Place of birth missing (living people)
Association football defenders